Perissodini is a tribe of African cichlids, containing three genera of freshwater fish found only in Lake Tanganyika.

One of its genera, Haplotaxodon, feeds on small fish and zooplankton. The other two genera are specialised in eating scales from other fish. They are all mouthbrooders.

References

External links
 https://www.uniprot.org/taxonomy/319066
 https://web.archive.org/web/20071206122807/http://www.practicalfishkeeping.co.uk/pfk/pages/item.php?news=1344

 
Pseudocrenilabrinae